Cannabis in Malaysia is illegal, although there are plans to make exceptions for medical purposes. Recreational use of cannabis under Malaysian legislation provides for a mandatory death penalty for convicted drug traffickers. Individuals arrested in possession of 200 grams (seven ounces) of marijuana are presumed by law to be trafficking in drugs. Individuals arrested in possession of 50 grams (1,5 ounces) or less will be sentenced to imprisonment up to 10 years.

History
Following the British acquisition of Dutch Malacca, by 1826 the British were raising taxes from the production of bhang.

Cannabis restrictions in Malaysia date as far back as the Dangerous Drugs Ordinance 1952 in British Malaya prior to independence.

According to Dangerous Drugs Act 1952 in Malaysia, cannabis possession is a punishable offence. The penalty five years imprisonment or a fine of up to RM20,000.

Reform
In 2018, public outrage over a death penalty handed to a 29-year-old man led Malaysia to discuss legalising cannabis for medical use, which could make them one of the first nations in Asia to do so. The previous Malaysian cabinet also discussed the medicinal value of marijuana in a September 2018 meeting and started early and informal talks on amending the relevant laws. However, as of 2021, such plans never materialised, and Malaysia since had a change of government under unrelated circumstances.

During the debate session for 12th Malaysia Plan, Syed Saddiq proposed a review for use of medical marijuana. He cites the possibility of using it as alternative medical treatment for youths suffering mental health issues, while noting the expected growth of this industry to over RM400 billion in next 4 years from current annual grosses of RM60 billion.

References